Case of Sutton's Hospital (1612) 77 Eng Rep 960 is an old common law case decided by Sir Edward Coke. It concerned The Charterhouse, London which was held to be a properly constituted corporation.

Facts
Thomas Sutton was a coal mine owner and moneylender, as well as the Master of Ordnance for the North of England, a military position. He founded a school and hospital as a corporation at the London Charterhouse. When he died, he left a large part of his estate to the charity. Sutton's other heirs challenged the bequest by arguing that the charity was improperly constituted. Therefore, they argued, it lacked a legal personality to be the subject of a transfer of property.

Judgment
In a full hearing of the King's Bench it was held that the incorporation was valid, as was the subsequent foundation of the charity and so the transfer of property to it, including the nomination of a master of the charity to receive the donation, was not void.

Sir Edward Coke wrote in the report the following.

Citations

The case has been cited in a number of subsequent decisions.  Notably, in Hazell v Hammersmith and Fulham LBC [1992] 2 AC 1, Lord Templeman referred to it, and although he acknowledged it to be good law, he also noted that to modern eyes the language was so impenetrable that most lawyers simply took it on faith that the case stood for the principle for which it is cited. He summarised the ratio decidendi of the case thus:

The case was also cited with approval (but distinguished) in another House of Lords case, Ashbury Railway Carriage and Iron Co Ltd v Riche (1875) LR 7 HL 653.

See also
UK company law
Salomon v A Salomon & Co Ltd [1897] AC 22
Lennard's Carrying Co Ltd v Asiatic Petroleum Co Ltd [1915] AC 705
United States corporate law
Trustees of Dartmouth College v. Woodward, 17 US 518 (1819)
Paul v. Virginia, 75 US 168 (1869), a corporation was not a citizen within the meaning of the Privileges and Immunities Clause
Santa Clara County v. Southern Pacific Railroad Company, 118 US 394 (1886) in a property tax case, the US Supreme Court holds that corporations are obviously "persons" with the meaning of the Fourteenth Amendment
Citizens United v. Federal Election Commission, 130 S.Ct. 876 (2010) corporations are persons under the First Amendment and hence have the unlimited right to produce campaigning material at election times

Notes

References

External links 
"The Case of Sutton’s Hospital." from Sir Edward Coke, Selected Writings of Sir Edward Coke, vol. I, at the Online Library of Liberty

1612 in English law
United Kingdom company case law
1612 in England
Edward Coke cases
United Kingdom corporate personality case law
History of corporate law
Court of Exchequer Chamber cases